The Bounce Back is a 2016 American romantic comedy film directed by Youssef Delara and is loosely inspired by The Bounce Back Book by Karen Salmansohn. The film stars Shemar Moore, Nadine Velazquez, Bill Bellamy, Sheryl Underwood, and Kali Hawk. Viva Pictures Distribution released the film on December 9, 2016.

Plot
Matthew Taylor (Shemar Moore), a father, author, and relationship expert is on a book tour promoting his new best-selling book, The Bounce Back. He has everything figured out until he meets the acerbic Kristin Peralta (Nadine Velazquez), a talk show circuit therapist who is convinced that he is nothing but a charlatan. Matthew's life is turned upside down when he inadvertently falls for Kristin and has to face the painful truth of his past relationship.

Cast
Shemar Moore as Matthew Taylor
Nadine Velazquez as Kristin Peralta
Bill Bellamy as Terry Twist
Sheryl Underwood as Nina
Kali Hawk as Jessica Williams
Matthew Willig as Vladamir
Michael Beach as George
Vanessa Bell Calloway as Ellen
Nishi Munshi as Haifa
Denise Boutte as Julie
Megan Stevenson as Sarah
Robinne Lee as Sam
Nadja Alaya as Aleya Taylor

Release
The Bounce Back was released on December 9, 2016, in the United States in 615 theaters.

Box office
The Bounce Back was released alongside Office Christmas Party along with the wide expansions of Miss Sloane and Nocturnal Animals, and was expected to gross $1.3 million from 615 theaters in its opening weekend. However, it only grossed $227,354 in its opening weekend, making it the 31st worst opening for a wide release in movie history. The film grossed $321,910 in the United States and Canada and $99,494 in other territories for a worldwide total of $421,404.

Reception
On review aggregator website Rotten Tomatoes, the film has an approval rating of 67%, based on 6 reviews, with an average rating of 5.8/10.

References

External links
 
 
 

2016 films
2016 romantic comedy films
American independent films
American romantic comedy films
Films based on American novels
Films based on romance novels
2016 independent films
2010s English-language films
2010s American films